F.C. De Kampioenen (F.C. The Champions) is a long-running Flemish sitcom chronicling the (mis)adventures of a fictional local football team. It originally aired on the Belgian-Flemish channel TV1 (now Eén) between 1990 and 2011, for 21 seasons with 273 half-hour-long episodes, making it one of the most successful comedy programs ever on Belgian television.

The series relies heavily on stereotypical characters and farce for its humour. The story is mainly set around a few male members of a local soccer club and their wives who regularly visit the club canteen before or after a training or match. Next to the field is another commercial property, owned by a hostile neighbour. Most of the episodes are based on misunderstandings or dirty tricks from these neighbours.

The series has had various directors, with Etienne Vervoort, Stef Desmyter, Johan Gevers, Willy Vanduren, and Eric Taelman having the biggest episode count, respectively. The most active writers have been Bart Cooreman, René Swartenbroekx, Knarf Van Pellecom, Anton Klee, and Frank Van Laecke.

Seasons 1–21 have all been released on DVD through Universal Pictures and Lime-Lights.

After the television series ended, 4 theatrical movies were released between 2013 and 2019. An 8 episode limited series return was planned for 2021, but the project was halted after the death of main cast member Johny Voners. Instead, a one-off 90-minute episode was filmed and released on December 25, 2020.

Cast

Overview

Main characters

Recurring characters

TV Series (1990-2011)

TV Special (2020) 
In October 2019 plans were announced to film a 22nd season consisting of 8 episodes. The future of this project was left in limbo after the death of main cast member Johny Voners in March 2020, as several cast members came forward expressing they did not like the idea of continuing the franchise without him.

In July 2020, it was announced that the cast would instead reunite to film a 90-minute episode, which will be set during Christmas time and address the loss of Voners' character. The episode was released on December 25, 2020. Returning main cast members from the television series include Marijn Devalck, Danni Heylen, An Swartenbroekx, Loes Van den Heuvel, Ann Tuts, Herman Verbruggen, Ben Rottiers, Jaak Van Assche, Tuur De Weert, and Jacques Vermeire, alongside recurring cast members Machteld Timmermans, Niels Destadsbader, Rob Teuwen, and Luk D'Heu. Johny Voners and Carry Goossens appear in flashbacks scenes through archive footage, which also include brief shots of Walter Michiels, Jakob Beks and some of the former guest stars.

Plot
Six months after the death of Xavier Waterslaeghers, the remaining core of F.C. De Kampioenen holds a Christmas party at the cafe.
Carmen does not feel like going, but changes her mind after receiving a letter from her late husband. Fernand and DDT are invited as well, but are too stingy to pay for food and Christmas gifts. Both men still know their tricks and cheat Marc out of money of the newly established Xavier Waterslaeghers Fund. As a gift for Doortje, Pol has invited her son Billie. It is revealed that Billie has been living in America, and why Doortje has not spoken about him for years. However, the most precious gift is that for Carmen, by a surprise question by Ronald and Niki.

Theatrical movies

Failed attempts for a movie 
A first attempt to create a theatrical movie was done in 1993. However, the film was cancelled as actor Carry Goossens decided to work for a competing broadcasting company (vtm) and actor Walter Michiels was fired due to his alcohol abuse. Furthermore, Jacques Vermeire had his own film plans and his movie Max was to be shot and released in same period.

A new scenario was written in 2008 but rejected by most of the actors.

F.C. De Kampioenen: Kampioen zijn blijft plezant (2013) 
In 2011 a complete new story was written which was accepted by the actors. Due to funding issues it took until April 2013 before filming started. The movie was released in December 2013 as "F.C. De Kampioenen: Kampioen zijn blijft plezant" which can be translated as "F.C. The Champions: being a champion remains fun".

Returning main cast members from the television series include Marijn Devalck, Danni Heylen, An Swartenbroekx, Johny Voners, Loes Van den Heuvel, Ann Tuts, Herman Verbruggen, Ben Rottiers, Jaak Van Assche, and Tuur De Weert, alongside recurring cast members Machteld Timmermans, Niels Destadsbader, Lea Couzin, Fred Van Kuyk, Leah Thys, and Michel De Warzee.

Plot
Boma wants to buy a vineyard and château in France from an oil sheik not knowing most part of the land will be expropriated due to the construction of a TGV. Boma is now negotiating with Tartuffe, a representative of the sheik. Tartuffe invites FC De Kampioenen to come over to France to play a match of soccer against the team of Saint-Tintin. Due to a miscommunication between Tartuffe and the sheik, last one thinks Ronald, foreman of De Kampioenen, is the Brazilian footballer Ronaldinho and offers him a contract.

De Kampioenen head to France, but the journey has some unexpected events. Pol and Doortje just married and Doortje wants to go on honeymoon to Lourdes. Pol sabotages the trip so he can go to Saint-Tintin. Doortje finds out the truth and enters a convent. The coach bus is an outdated model driven by Fernand Costermans who hides a pig in the trunk so he can search for truffles. Everybody is tired of Carmen's involvements, so Xavier decides to leave her behind at a road house. Bieke is brassed off with the childish behavior of Mark and starts a romance with a Frenchman. Pascale is obsessed by châteaus and demands Maurice to finally renovate his mother's castle or to buy another one.

Ronald finds out the real intentions of the sheik, but is kidnapped by Tartuffe before he could inform De Kampioenen. Carlita, a hitchhiker travelling with De Kampioenen, is actually a helper of Tartuffe. She has a guilty conscience and sets up a rescue operation together with De Kampioenen.

F.C. De Kampioenen 2: Jubilee general (2015) 
In August 2014, there were rumors of a second movie which were confirmed in October 2014. It was released on October 28, 2015.

Returning main cast members from the television series include Marijn Devalck, Danni Heylen, An Swartenbroekx, Johny Voners, Loes Van den Heuvel, Ann Tuts, Herman Verbruggen, Ben Rottiers, Jaak Van Assche, Tuur De Weert, Jacques Vermeire, and Carry Goossens, alongside recurring cast members Machteld Timmermans, Niels Destadsbader, and Luk D'Heu.

Plot
F.C. De Kampioenen prepares a big celebration party for their 25th anniversary. Carmen, Doortje, Pascale and Bieke reunite with their band The Championettes. Marc and Xavier travel to Thailand and can convince Oscar to leave Hare Krishna and to return to Belgium. Oscar his old habits come back: he wants to be the trainer once again, the bickers between him and Pascale restart,... This all gets at it top when it is revealed Goedele and Oscar had a one-night stand on 31 December 1993 and Ronaldhino was conceived that night, meaning Oscar is the biological father of the boy and not the famous soccer player Ronaldhino as the young man always thought.

Meanwhile, their main antagonist DDT is released from prison. He wins from Boma in a game of poker and becomes owner of last one's Cadillac, the soccer canteen and the soccer field. Boma consults his lawyers and they confirm due to the fact he signed a paper in which he hands over these properties and with witnesses, DDT is now indeed the legal owner. Boma and Fernand set up a trap so DDT ends up in a container on a boat heading to Africa, not knowing Doortje is also in the trap by accident. DDT and Doortje manage to return to Belgium. He wants revenge and hires some bulldozers to demolish the pub next to the soccer field so he can build his new garage, not knowing the current building is classified and must remain as is.

F.C. De Kampioenen 3: Forever (2017) 
In January 2016, it was confirmed that a third movie would be made. Filming started in the summer of 2017, and the movie was released in December 2017.

Returning main cast members from the television series include Marijn Devalck, Danni Heylen, An Swartenbroekx, Johny Voners, Loes Van den Heuvel, Ann Tuts, Herman Verbruggen, Ben Rottiers, Jaak Van Assche, Tuur De Weert, Jacques Vermeire, and Carry Goossens, alongside recurring cast members Machteld Timmermans, Niels Destadsbader, and Luk D'Heu.

Plot
Balthasar Boma is arrested for severe food safety offences. DDT offers Boma to buy F.C. De Kampioenen, which would enable the latter to bond out of jail. Boma accepts the deal, but soon regrets it when DDT replaces all current players by younger and better ones. DDT eventually agrees on offering the old Kampioenen a chance: one match against DDT's team, after which the winner gets to keep the club. The old Kampioenen realize they stand no chance, unless they attract new players as well. Pol remembers having seen a lot of potential soccer talents back when he was working in Africa, and convinces his friends to join him on a scouting trip.

F.C. De Kampioenen 4: Viva Boma (2019) 
The fourth movie was filmed early 2019 and released in December 2019.

Returning main cast members from the television series include Marijn Devalck, Danni Heylen, An Swartenbroekx, Johny Voners, Loes Van den Heuvel, Ann Tuts, Herman Verbruggen, Ben Rottiers, Jaak Van Assche, Tuur De Weert, Jacques Vermeire, Carry Goossens, and Jakob Beks, alongside recurring cast members Machteld Timmermans, Niels Destadsbader, and Luk D'Heu.

Plot
F.C. De Kampioenen mourns the loss of their chairman Balthasar Boma, who was reportedly killed by a bunch of wild kangaroos while on holiday in Australia. Ronald becomes his successor at the meat factory, but does not seem to be fit for the job. His focus soon shifts to his new love interest Niki, who turns out to be the daughter of Dimitri De Tremmerie. DDT sees a new opportunity to lay his hands on Boma's company and take revenge on De Kampioenen. The latter meanwhile plan to join a carnival procession in which they will honor Boma and his final brainchild: the "Viva Boma" sausage. After receiving a surprising phone call, Doortje tries to convince everyone that Boma is still alive.

Comics adaptations
Since 1997 F.C. De Kampioenen has been adapted into an equally long-running and successful comics series, F.C. De Kampioenen, drawn by Hec Leemans.

Trivia
FC De Kampioenen was once the longest-running Belgian sitcom in number of seasons (21) and episodes (273). It was however beaten by De Kotmadam of which season 24 is currently in production and 333 episodes have already aired. In terms of audience measurement FC De Kampioenen breaks all records with an average 1.2 million viewers for its last season in 2011 whereas De Kotmadam only ends at 750.000 for its 23rd season in 2019.
 The producers revealed that Boma's clothes were indeed made from curtain material as was many times insinuated/said in the series.
 On 13 September 2015 actors of F.C. De Kampioenen ran a campaign in castle Ravenhof in Putte for raising awareness for autism and people with autism.

References

External links

Official site
Fansite

Flemish television shows
Fictional association football clubs
1990 Belgian television series debuts
2011 Belgian television series endings
Belgian television sitcoms
Television shows adapted into comics
Television shows adapted into films
Fictional association football television series
Television shows set in Belgium
Works set in Flanders
Eén original programming